The Cidariini are the largest tribe of geometer moths in the subfamily Larentiinae (possibly a distinct family). The Cidariini include many of the species known as "carpets" or, ambiguously, "carpet moths" (most other "carpets" are in the Xanthorhoini), and are among the few geometer moths that have been subject to fairly comprehensive cladistic study of their phylogeny. The tribe was described by Philogène Auguste Joseph Duponchel in 1845.

Genera
As several larentiine genera have not yet been assigned to a tribe, the genus list is still preliminary; for example the genus Almeria may well belong in the Cidariini. Several well-known species are also listed:

Footnotes

References

  (2008): Family group names in Geometridae. Retrieved 22 July 2008.
 
  (2008): Characterisation of the Australian Nacophorini using adult morphology, and phylogeny of the Geometridae based on morphological characters. Zootaxa 1736: 1-141. PDF abstract and excerpt
  (2005): Pljushtchia prima, new moth genus and species from Tadjikistan (Lepidoptera: Geometridae). abstract

 
Larentiinae
Insect tribes